Ranisav Jovanović (Serbian Cyrillic: Ранисав Јовановић; born 5 November 1980) is a German footballer of Bosnian Serb origin.

Career
He was in the news in mid-August 2009 when he got into a fight with Fortuna team mate Robert Palikuća at a training session. The fight ended with Jovanović pushing Palikuća to the ground and choking him before they got separated by team mates.

In July 2013 due to financial problems, he moved from MSV Duisburg to SV Sandhausen.

Career statistics

1.Includes UEFA Cup and Promotion playoff.

References

External links
 
 Ranisav Jovanović at kicker 
 

1980 births
Living people
German footballers
Tennis Borussia Berlin players
Dynamo Dresden players
1. FSV Mainz 05 II players
1. FSV Mainz 05 players
Rot Weiss Ahlen players
Fortuna Düsseldorf II players
Fortuna Düsseldorf players
Bundesliga players
MSV Duisburg players
SV Sandhausen players
FSV Frankfurt players
2. Bundesliga players
3. Liga players
Association football forwards
Footballers from Berlin